
The Inkerman Monastery of St. Clement is a cave monastery in a cliff rising near the mouth of the Black River, in the city of Inkerman, administered as part of the sea port of Sevastopol.

History 

It was founded in 1850 on the site of a medieval Byzantine monastery where the relics of St. Clement were supposedly kept before their removal to San Clemente by Saints Cyril and Methodius. The early Christians are supposed to have kept the relics in a grotto which could be visited only on the anniversary of his death. William Rubruck described it as a church "built by the hands of angels".

The Byzantine monastery, probably founded in the 8th century by icon-venerators fleeing persecution in their homeland, had eight chapels of several storeys and an inn accessed by a stairway. The caves of Inkerman were surveyed by Peter Simon Pallas in 1793 and looted by the British in the 1850s.

The Russians added two churches, commemorating the Borki Incident (1895) and the Crimean War (1905). The monastery was damaged by the 1927 Crimean earthquakes and was closed between 1931 and 1991. During World War II the caves housed the officers of a Soviet army defending Sevastopol. Several churches were taken down by the Soviets.

See also
 Bakhchisaray Cave Monastery

References

External links
 

Buildings and structures in Sevastopol
Cave monasteries
Eastern Orthodox monasteries in Ukraine
Tourist attractions in Sevastopol
Christianity in Crimea
Monasteries of the Ukrainian Orthodox Church (Moscow Patriarchate)
Russian Orthodox monasteries in Russia
Cultural heritage monuments in Sevastopol
Objects of cultural heritage of Russia of federal significance